The 2000 Florida Gators baseball team represented the University of Florida in the sport of baseball during the 2000 college baseball season. The Gators competed in Division I of the National Collegiate Athletic Association (NCAA) and the Eastern Division of the Southeastern Conference (SEC). They played their home games at Alfred A. McKethan Stadium, on the university's Gainesville, Florida campus. The team was coached by Andy Lopez, who was in his sixth season at Florida.

Roster

Schedule 

! style="background:#FF4A00;color:white;"| Regular season: 38–20–1
|- valign="top" 

|- align="center" bgcolor="ddffdd"
| January 20 ||at ||No. 24
|Rainbow StadiumHonolulu, HI
|12–6
|Belflower (1–0)
|Ho (0–1)
|None
|2,162
|1–0||–
|- align="center" bgcolor="ddffdd"
| January 21 ||at Hawaiʻi||No. 24
|Rainbow Stadium
|10–1
|Smalley (1–0)
|Snider (0–1)
|None
|2,251
|2–0||–
|- align="center" bgcolor="ddffdd"
| January 22 ||at Hawaiʻi||No. 24
|Rainbow Stadium
|8–7
|McFarland (1–0)
|Aloy (0–1)
|Simon (1)
|2,595
|3–0||–
|-

|- align="center" bgcolor="ffdddd"
| February 4 ||at No. 5 Rivalry||No. 24||Mark Light StadiumCoral Gables, FL||8–16||Howell (1–0)||Ramshaw (0–1)||None||3,633||3–1||–
|- align="center" bgcolor="ffdddd"
| February 5 ||at No. 5 Miami (FL)Rivalry||No. 24||Mark Light Stadium||1–17||Roberson (1–0)||Smalley (1–1)||None||4,004||3–2||–
|- align="center" bgcolor="ffdddd"
| February 9 ||||No. 24|| McKethan Stadium ||11-13||Shippee (1–0)||Simon (0–1)||Bell (1)||1,828||3–3||–
|- align="center" bgcolor="ddffdd"
| February 12 ||No. 5 Miami (FL)Rivalry||No. 24|| McKethan Stadium ||4–3||Simon (1–1)||DeBold (1–1)||None||3,012||4–3
|–
|- align="center" bgcolor="ddffdd"
| February 13 ||No. 5 Miami (FL)Rivalry||No. 24|| McKethan Stadium ||20-11||Ramshaw (1–1)||Walker (0–1)||None||3,513||5–3
|–
|- align="center" bgcolor="ffdddd"
| February 19 ||No. 1 Florida StateRivalry||No. 20|| McKethan Stadium ||2–6||McDonald (3–0)||Hart (0–1)||None||5,613||5–4
|–
|- align="center" bgcolor="ffdddd"
| February 20 ||No. 1 Florida StateRivalry||No. 20|| McKethan Stadium ||8–17||Ziegler (3–0)||Mosher (0–1)||None||4,809||5–5
|–
|- align="center" bgcolor="ddffdd"
| February 22 ||||No. 27|| McKethan Stadium ||10–3||Smalley (2–1)||Barton (1–2)||None||1,188||6–5||–
|- align="center" bgcolor="ffdddd"
| February 26 ||at No. 1 Florida StateRivalry||No. 27||Dick Howser StadiumTallahassee, FL||2–6||McDonald (4–0)||Belflower (1–1)||None||5,039||6–6||–
|- align="center" bgcolor="ffdddd"
| February 27 ||at No. 1 Florida StateRivalry||No. 27||Dick Howser Stadium||7–8||Jernigan (1–0)||Simon (1–2)||None||2,011||6–7||–
|- align="center" bgcolor="ddffdd"
| February 29 |||||| McKethan Stadium ||9–2||Smalley (3–1)||Phalines (1–1)||None||1,503||7–7||–
|-

|- align="center" bgcolor="ffdddd"
| March 1 ||UNC Greensboro|||| McKethan Stadium ||4–12||Gordon (1–0)||Sobieraj (0–1)||None||781||7–8||–
|- align="center" bgcolor="ddffdd"
| March 3 |||||| McKethan Stadium ||11–9||Belflower (2–1)||Skirkanich (0–1)||Birch (1)||1,522||8–8
|–
|- align="center" bgcolor="ddffdd"
| March 4 ||Massachusetts|||| McKethan Stadium ||7–1||Cardozo (1–0)||Santos (0–1)||None||1,252||9–8
|–
|- align="center" bgcolor="ddffdd"
| March 5 ||Massachusetts|||| McKethan Stadium ||7–5||Birch (1–0)||Szado (0–1)||None||1,457||10–8
|–
|- align="center" bgcolor="ffdddd"
| March 7 |||||| McKethan Stadium ||7–11||Mattingly (2–3)||Mosher (0–2)||None||1,143||10–9||–
|- align="center" bgcolor="ddffdd"
| March 8 ||Louisville|||| McKethan Stadium ||||Sobieraj (1–1)||Green (0–3)||None||847||11–9||–
|- align="center" bgcolor="ffdddd"
| March 10 |||||| McKethan Stadium ||5–11||McAvoy (4–1)||Smalley (3–2)||Goodwin (2)||1,072||11–10||0–1
|- align="center" bgcolor="ffdddd"
| March 11 ||Ole Miss|||| McKethan Stadium ||12–15||Morris (1–0)||Belflower (2–2)||Huisman (4)||1,643||11–11||0–2
|- align="center" bgcolor="ddffdd"
| March 12 ||Ole Miss|||| McKethan Stadium ||13–3||Cardozo (2–0)||Cramblitt (3–2)||Birch (2)||1,360||12–11
|1–2
|- align="center" bgcolor="ddffdd"
| March 14 |||||| McKethan Stadium ||6–4||Simon (2–2)||Kelly (0–1)||Mosher (1)||1,172||13–11
|–
|- align="center" bgcolor="ddffdd"
| March 15 ||Fordham|||| McKethan Stadium ||25–1||Belflower (3–2)||Reyes (0–3)||None||1,181||14–11
|–
|- align="center" bgcolor="ffdddd"
| March 17 ||at No. 5 ||||Sarge Frye FieldColumbia, SC||2–5||Bouknight (7–0)||Smalley (3–3)||Barber (5)||4,128||14–12||1–3
|- align="center" bgcolor="ffdddd"
| March 18 ||at No. 5 South Carolina||||Sarge Frye Field||3–7||Bauer (4–0)||Cardozo (2–1)||None||3,387||14–13||1–4
|- align="center" bgcolor="ddffdd"
| March 19 ||at No. 5 South Carolina||||Sarge Frye Field||17–8||Birch (2–0)||Collins (1–1)||None||3,848||15–13||2–4
|- align="center" bgcolor="ddffdd"
| March 24 ||at ||||Baum StadiumFayetteville, AR||8–711||Birch (3–0)||McCrotty (0–4)||None||2,472||16–13||3–4
|- align="center" bgcolor="ddffdd"
| March 25 ||at Arkansas||||Baum Stadium||8–710||Simon (3–2)||Merryman (0–1)||None||2,447||17–13||4–4
|- align="center" bgcolor="ddffdd"
| March 26 ||at Arkansas||||Baum Stadium||7–4||Rojas (1–0)||Riethmaier (0–4)||None||1,493||18–13||5–4
|- align="center" bgcolor="ddffdd"
| March 28 |||||| McKethan Stadium ||16–8||Simon (4–2)||Anderson (2–4)||None||1,370||19–13||–
|- align="center" bgcolor="ddffdd"
| March 29 ||Samford|||| McKethan Stadium ||9–6||Birch (4–0)||–||–||–||20–13||–
|- align="center" bgcolor="ffdddd"
| March 31 |||||| McKethan Stadium ||4–7||Yee (4–2)||Smalley (3–4)||Beal (2)||1,586||20–14||5–5
|-

|- align="center" bgcolor="ddffdd"
| April 1 ||Vanderbilt|||| McKethan Stadium ||5–2||Cardozo (3–1)||Cook (1–3)||None||1,322||21–14||6–5
|- align="center" bgcolor="ddffdd"
| April 2 ||Vanderbilt|||| McKethan Stadium ||10–6||Simon (5–2)||Beal (2–5)||Belflower (1)||1,298||22–14
|7–5
|- align="center" bgcolor="ddffdd"
| April 4 |||||| McKethan Stadium ||15–3||Rojas (2–0)||Marrero (1–4)||None||810||23–14
|–
|- align="center" bgcolor="ddffdd"
| April 5 ||Bethune–Cookman|||| McKethan Stadium ||10–3||Simon (6–2)||Martin (2–3)||None||860||24–14
|–
|- align="center" bgcolor="ddffdd"
| April 7 ||at ||||Cliff Hagan StadiumLexington, KY||7–2||Belflower (4–2)||Webb (5–1)||None||891||25–14
|8–5
|- align="center" bgcolor="ddffdd"
| April 8 ||at Kentucky||||Cliff Hagan Stadium||18–0||Cardozo (4–1)||Michael (4–1)||Rojas (1)||315||26–14
|9–5
|- align="center" bgcolor="F0E8E8"
| April 9 ||at Kentucky||||Cliff Hagan Stadium||6–6||None||None||None||559||26–14–1||9–5–1
|- align="center" bgcolor="ddffdd"
| April 12 ||No. 25 ||No. 29|| McKethan Stadium ||10–3||Birch (5–0)||Wilson (3–1)||None||1,218||27–14–1||–
|- align="center" bgcolor="ffdddd"
| April 15 (1) ||No. 7 LSU||No. 29|| McKethan Stadium ||4–10||Gomez (6–0)||Smalley (3–5)||McMurray (1)||–||27–15–1||9–6–1
|- align="center" bgcolor="ffdddd"
| April 15 (2) ||No. 7 LSU||No. 29|| McKethan Stadium ||6–9||Tallet (8–2)||Cardozo (4–2)||None||2,327||27–16–1||9–7–1
|- align="center" bgcolor="ddffdd"
| April 16 ||No. 7 LSU||No. 29|| McKethan Stadium ||7–5||Simon (7–2)||Hodges (2–2)||None||1,629||28–16–1||10–7–1
|- align="center" bgcolor="ddffdd"
| April 19 ||at Jacksonville||||Wolfson ParkJacksonville, FL||9–1||Rojas (3–0)||Williams (2–3)||None||3,419||29–16–1||–
|- align="center" bgcolor="ffdddd"
| April 21 ||at ||||Knoxville, TN||4–5||Bennett (8–2)||Smalley (3–6)||None||918||29–17–1||10–8–1
|- align="center" bgcolor="ddffdd"
| April 22 ||at Tennessee||||||8–5||Rojas (4–0)||Bertolino (4–3)||None||1,490||30–17–1||11–8–1
|- align="center" bgcolor="ddffdd"
| April 23 ||at Tennessee||||||10–9||–||–||–||–||31–17–1||12–8–1
|- align="center" bgcolor="ddffdd"
| April 28 ||No. 12 ||No. 27|| McKethan Stadium ||5–3||Smalley (4–6)||Bean (8–2)||None||1,774||32–17–1||13–8–1
|- align="center" bgcolor="ffdddd"
| April 29 ||No. 12 Auburn||No. 27|| McKethan Stadium ||8–1110||–||–||–||–||32–18–1||13–9–1
|- align="center" bgcolor="ddffdd"
| April 30 ||No. 12 Auburn||No. 27|| McKethan Stadium ||7–6||Belflower (5–3)||Bean (8–3)||None||2,612||33–18–1||14–9–1
|-

|- align="center" bgcolor="ffdddd"
| May 5 ||at No. 7 ||No. 22||Dudy Noble FieldStarkville, MS
|2–20||Donovan (5–3)||Smalley (4–7)||None||6,524||33–19–1||14–10–1
|- align="center" bgcolor="ddffdd"
| May 6 ||at No. 7 Mississippi State||No. 22||Dudy Noble Field||9–611||Belflower (6–3)||Larson (3–3)||None||7,285||34–19–1||15–10–1
|- align="center" bgcolor="ffdddd"
| May 7 ||at No. 7 Mississippi State||No. 22||Dudy Noble Field||7–12||Freed (8–0)||Mosher (0–3)||Wooten (1)||4,779||34-20–1||15–11–1
|- align="center" bgcolor="ddffdd"
| May 9 ||||No. 24|| McKethan Stadium ||10–5||Rojas (5–0)||Hubbard (0–2)||Birch (3)||1,374||35–20–1||–
|- align="center" bgcolor="ddffdd"
| May 12 ||||No. 24|| McKethan Stadium ||9–1||Smalley (5–7)||Clark (7–4)||None||2,143||36–20–1||16–11–1
|- align="center" bgcolor="ddffdd"
| May 13 ||Georgia||No. 24|| McKethan Stadium ||7–6||Cardozo (5–2)||Steele (6–4)||Belflower (3)||3,217||37–20–1||17–11–1
|- align="center" bgcolor="ddffdd"
| May 14 ||Georgia||No. 24|| McKethan Stadium ||7–4||Simon (8–2)||Sharpton (3–4)||Belflower (4)||1,754||38–20–1|| 18–11–1 
|-

|-
! style="background:#FF4A00;color:white;"| Post-season: 6–3
|-

|- align="center" bgcolor="ddffdd"
| May 17 ||vs. (5) No. 17 Auburn||(4) No. 21||Metropolitan StadiumHoover, AL||7–2||Smalley (6–7)||Speigner (2–3)||None||–||39–20–1||1–0
|- align="center" bgcolor="ddffdd"
| May 18 ||vs. (8) Kentucky||(4) No. 21||Metropolitan Stadium||8–7||Simon (9–2)||Wade (7–7)||Belflower (5)||9,252||40–20–1||2–0
|- align="center" bgcolor="ddffdd"
| May 20 ||vs. (1) No. 1 South Carolina||(4) No. 21||Metropolitan Stadium||12–4||Rojas (6–0)||Whetstone (0–2)||Wiegandt (1)||3,224||41–20–1||3–0
|- align="center" bgcolor="ffdddd"
| May 21 ||vs. (2) No. 10 LSU||(4) No. 21||Metropolitan Stadium||6–9||Gomez (9–1)||McFarland (1–1)||Tallet (1)||5,103||41–21–1||3–1
|-

|- align="center" bgcolor="ffdddd"
| May 26 ||vs. (3) ||(2) No. 18||Baylor BallparkWaco, TX||1–4||Key (12–2)||Smalley (6–8)||None||2,805||41–22–1||0–1
|- align="center" bgcolor="ddffdd"
| May 27 (1) ||at (1) No. 5 ||(2) No. 18||Baylor Ballpark||10–1||Cardozo (6–2)||Evans (11–2)||None||3,316||42–22–1||1–1
|- align="center" bgcolor="ddffdd"
| May 27 (2) || (4) ||(2) No. 18||Baylor Ballpark||14–0||Simon (10–2)||Casanova (3–4)||None||3,168||43–22–1||2–1
|- align="center" bgcolor="ddffdd"
| May 28 ||vs. (3) San José State||(2) No. 18||Baylor Ballpark||8–7||Belflower (7–3)||Key (12–3)||None||2,847||44–22–1||3–1
|- align="center" bgcolor="ffdddd"
| May 29 ||vs. (3) No. 15 San José State||(2) No. 16||Baylor Ballpark||1–3||Sandler (2–2)||Smalley (6–9)||None||2,645||44–23–1||3–2
|-

Rankings from Collegiate Baseball. All times Eastern. Retrieved from FloridaGators.com

References 

Florida
Florida Gators baseball seasons
Florida
Florida Gators baseball